Nikola Gavrić (born 17 March 1995), is a Croatian football defender who plays for Opatija.

Club career
Born in Pula, the capital of Istria County, Gavrić played in the youth team of local side NK Istra 1961 before signing his first professional contract when he was 18, with Serbian side FK Vojvodina. After a year playing for the youth and B teams of Vojvodina, he moved to Italy and played with F.C. Francavilla in the first half of the 2014–15 Serie D. During the winter-break he returned to Croatia and joined NK Novigrad. He was part of the team that won the 2015–16 Croatian Third League–West and playing subsequently in the 2016–17 Croatian Second Football League. Then he played with Sliema Wanderers F.C. in the 2017–18 Maltese Premier League and after a year in Malta, he moved to Serbia, this time signing with FK Sloboda Užice and playing in the 2018–19 Serbian First League.

Honours
Novigrad
Croatian Third Football League: 2015–16 (West)

References

1995 births
Living people
Sportspeople from Pula
Serbs of Croatia
Association football defenders
Croatian footballers
FK Vojvodina players
A.S.D. Francavilla players
NK Novigrad players
Sliema Wanderers F.C. players
FK Sloboda Užice players
FK Borec players
NK Sesvete players
NK Opatija players
Serie D players
Second Football League (Croatia) players
Maltese Premier League players
Serbian First League players
Macedonian First Football League players
First Football League (Croatia) players
Croatian expatriate footballers
Expatriate footballers in Serbia
Croatian expatriate sportspeople in Serbia
Expatriate footballers in Italy
Croatian expatriate sportspeople in Italy
Expatriate footballers in Malta
Croatian expatriate sportspeople in Malta
Expatriate footballers in North Macedonia
Croatian expatriate sportspeople in North Macedonia